The production of urban electric transport is a branch of Russian engineering. Russia has the largest number of trolley (85) and tram systems (86) in the world.

Aerial cableway

In 2012, the cableway connecting Nizhny Novgorod and Bor was launched. The main purpose is to provide an alternative type of passenger transportation in addition to river taxis, electric trains and buses.

History of trams 

In 1860 the first urban horse railway line (a predecessor of trams), known as konka—from the Russian kon, "horse"—opened in Saint Petersburg. In 1875, the world's first electric tram line operated in Sestroretsk near Saint Petersburg, Russia, invented and tested by Fyodor Pirotsky.
The first electric tram line in the Russian Empire opened in Kiev in 1892. That year, tram production began at the Kolomna Locomotive Works. Before World War I trams were produced at Sormovo, Mytishchi, Nikolaev, Riga and Saint Petersburg, but much of the rolling stock was imported. In 1899, Kursk and Oryol introduced tram lines. 

During World War I, the October Revolution and the Civil War tram production was suspended. As the economy of the  USSR recovered, tram production resumed in Sormovo, Kharkov, Mytishchi and Kiev. In 1934 the Petersburg Tram Mechanical Factory, the USSR's first dedicated tram factory, opened. Three years later, tram production began at UKVZ. During the Great Patriotic War, tram production was again suspended. In 1957 Gotha trams, used on narrow-gauge lines, were imported from the GDR. The following year,
Czechoslovak Tatra T2 trams were imported. In 1963 the Tatra T3 tram, one of the most popular models in the USSR and Russia, was introduced; a total of 11,368 were delivered. Later imports were the Tatra T4, T6B5, K2 and KT4. UKVZ began production of the KTM-5 (71-605 class, the world's largest tram car) in 1969; by 1992, about 15,000 cars were produced. 

In the Soviet era Moscow, Kiev and Ufa had Tatra T3 trams; Kazan and Kolomna had KTM-5s. Trams produced at the Petersburg Tram Mechanical Factory (PTMZ, then the Yegorov Leningrad Car Repair Plant) primarily remained in Leningrad, although some were delivered to other cities. After the dissolution of the Soviet Union, used Tatra trams were imported from the former socialist countries of Eastern Europe. The 1990s began a period of decline; in some cities lines were closed, and in others the tracks were removed. In 2005 production of the first Russian semi-low-floor tram, the LVS-2005, began. Three years later Russia's first three-section articulated tram, the LVS-2009 (71-154 class), was introduced. In 2013, the Petersburg Tram Mechanical Factory declared bankruptcy.

History of trolleybuses 

In 1933 the Soviet Union's first trolleybus network (and the world's largest) debuted in Moscow, and production of the first Soviet trolleybus (the LK-1, named for Lazar Kaganovich) began. During the Great Patriotic War, trolleybus production and service were suspended.
Production resumed at the Tushino engineering plant in 1946. In 1961, importation of the Czechoslovak trolley Skoda 9Tr began; during the 1980s, the Skoda 14Tr and 15Tr were imported.
Production of the ZiU-9, the world's largest trolley, began in 1972; more than 42,000 were built. During the 1990s, some trolleybus repair plants began producing their own models.

Subway history and production 
In 1935, the Moscow Metro opened. Subway-car production began at the Mytishschinsky Engineering Plant (now Metrowagonmash). Metro service continued during the Great Patriotic War. In 1955, the Leningrad Metro was built.

Current production 
The electric-transport market in Russia is dominated by three Russian trolleybus manufacturers, three tram manufacturers and two subway-car manufacturers but vehicles are also often imported from Belarus.

See also

 Transport in Russia
 Automotive industry in Russia
 List of trolleybus systems in Russia
 List of town tramway systems in Russia

References

External links
 official website of the International Association of enterprises of public electric transport (MAP GET )
 Urban Electric Transit .Joint tramway and trolleybus site

Industry in Russia
Tram transport in Russia
Public transport in Russia